The University of Hong Kong–Shenzhen Hospital (HKU-SZH) is a teaching hospital of the University of Hong Kong in Futian, Shenzhen, Guangdong, China. 

The 600-bed hospital is one of the two teaching hospitals of the University of Hong Kong. The Shenzhen municipal government constructed and provided funding for the facility.

History
The hospital opened in 2012. Its first head was Grace Tang Wai-king. The Shenzhen municipal government spent 4 billion yuan (about $624 million U.S. dollars) constructing the hospital. The Shenzhen Daily described it as the first "Hong Kong-style public hospital" in that city, and that residents "have shown great enthusiasm in" the hospital's introduction.

The hospital did not accept hongbao (red packets filled with cash) from patients in exchange for preferential service to them, and has been more conservative in giving out medications and intravenous therapy. For these reasons some patients had filed complaints against the style of healthcare given at HKU-SZH. The Chinese government had fully subsidized HKU-ZSH, but the hospital operated at heavy financial losses despite that. By 2014 HKU and the Shenzhen government were disputing which party should cover the 200 million Hong Kong dollar advance for clinical management and supervision. In 2014 the hospital received some subsidies, and at that time it began operating without a loss. By 2015 there had been steady increases in the numbers of patients. In 2015 the head of the governing council of HKU stated that HKU-SZH is expected to repay the HK$200M advance by 2023.

On 14 November 2016 Professor Lo Chung-mau was scheduled to become the head of HKU-SZH, replacing Grace Tang. He is a liver transplant expert, member of the HKU university council, and the head of surgery of HKU. In October 2016 Lo stated that there will be a new pricing policy. According to The Standard "[i]t is believed" that Lo is intended to establish an organ transplant programme at HKU-SZH.

Notes

References

External links

 The University of Hong Kong-Shenzhen Hospital
 The University of Hong Kong-Shenzhen Hospital 

Shenzhen Hospital
Hospitals in Shenzhen
Municipal hospitals